The  was a class of ocean liners of Japan, serving during the 1930s, and after World War II.

Background
In 1927-28, the NYK Line placed an order for eight ocean liners to reinforce the Japan–Seattle route (3 × Hikawa Maru class), Japan–San Francisco route (3 × Asama Maru class), and Japan–London route (2 × Terukuni Maru class). The Hikawa Maru class were named the Hikawa Maru, Hiye Maru (later Hei Maru) and Heian Maru.

Service
Hikawa Maru was completed on 25 April 1930. Her maiden voyage was 13 May 1930 for Yokohama–Seattle. Arrived at Seattle on 27 May. She sailed 73 times until August 1941. Her service was popular, and the cuisine was well-regarded, as NYK Line employed a chef trained in Europe.

Hie Maru was completed on 31 July 1930. Her maiden voyage was 23 August 1930 from Kobe.

Heian Maru was completed on 24 November 1930. Her maiden voyage was 18 December 1930 from Hong Kong.

All of them were enlisted by the Imperial Japanese Navy (IJN) in October–November 1941.

Ships in class

Service in World War II
 Hikawa Maru was classified to auxiliary hospital ship on 1 December 1941, and she assigned to the 4th Fleet.
 Hie Maru was classified to auxiliary submarine tender on 15 February 1942, and she assigned to the 6th Fleet.
 Heian Maru was classified to auxiliary submarine tender on 15 October 1941, and she assigned to the 6th Fleet.
 17 November 1943, Hie Maru was sunk by USN submarine.
 18 February 1944, Heian Maru was sunk by air raid at Chuuk.
 10 August 1946, Hikawa Maru survived war, and she was reverted to the NYK Line.

Ships in class as naval vessel

Photos

See also
 Asama Maru class ocean liner
 Terukuni Maru class ocean liner

Footnotes

Bibliography
 Tashirō Iwashige, The visual guide of Japanese wartime merchant marine,  (Japan), May 2009
Ships of the World special issue, The Golden Age of Japanese Passenger Liners, (Japan), May 2004
Voyage of a Century "Photo Collection of NYK Ships", (Japan), October 1985
 The Maru Special, Japanese Naval Vessels No.29, "Japanese submarine tenders w/ auxiliary submarine tenders",  (Japan), July 1979
 The Maru Special, Japanese Naval Vessels No.53, "Japanese support vessels", Ushio Shobō (Japan), July 1981

Ocean liner classes
World War II naval ships of Japan
Hospital ships of Japan
Submarine tenders
Ships of the NYK Line
World War II merchant ships of Japan